Nuclear fuel is stored in Canada at the following locations:

See also 
 List of nuclear waste storage facilities in Canada
 Nuclear power in Canada

References 

Nuclear energy in Canada